Randolph Gohi (born 4 April 1969 in Bordeaux, France) is a French former professional footballer who played as a midfielder. He made 12 appearances in Ligue 1 for Racing Paris in the 1986–87 season and in the 1989–90 season and 52 appearances scoring three goals in Ligue 2 for La Roche VF in the 1988–89 season and FC Martigues in the 1990–91 season.

References

1969 births
Living people
Footballers from Bordeaux
French footballers
Association football midfielders
Ligue 1 players
Ligue 2 players
Championnat National players
Racing Club de France Football players
FC Martigues players
La Roche VF players